Milan Zvarík (born 23 November 1951) is a former Czechoslovak football player.

Playing as central defender, after playing with local team TJ Jednota Bánová, he represented Spartak Trnava and Žilina in the Czechoslovak First League.

In 1985, along with Hungarian duo János Borsó and Pál Dárdai, they were the foreign signings of FK Vojvodina for that season, still playing in the former Yugoslav First League.

At national team level, he played a total of 3 matches for the Czechoslovak U-23 team.

References

External sources
 Český a československý fotbal: lexikon osobností a klubů : 1906–2006 at Google Books.
 Stats for Yugoslav Leagues at Zerodic.

1961 births
Living people
Slovak footballers
Czechoslovak footballers
Czechoslovak expatriate footballers
FC Spartak Trnava players
MŠK Žilina players
FK Vojvodina players
Expatriate footballers in Yugoslavia
Yugoslav First League players
Association football defenders
Czechoslovak expatriate sportspeople in Yugoslavia